Cormac MacDermot MacCarthy, 16th Lord of Muskerry (1552–1616) was an Irish magnate and soldier. He fought at the Siege of Kinsale during Tyrone's Rebellion.

Birth and origins 
Cormac was born in 1552, the eldest son of Dermot MacCarthy and Ellen FitzGerald. His father was the 13th Lord of Muskerry. His father's full name, including his patronymic middle name, was Dermot MacTeige MacCarthy. His own full name was therefore Cormac MacDermot MacCarthy. His father's family were the MacCarthys of Muskerry, a Gaelic Irish dynasty that had branched from the MacCarthy-Mor line in the 14th century when a younger son received Muskerry as appanage.

His mother was a daughter of Sir Maurice FitzJohn FitzGerald of Totane, third son of John FitzGerald, de facto 12th Earl of Desmond and younger brother of James FitzJohn FitzGerald, 13th Earl of Desmond.

Cormac had a brother Teige, who was ancestor of the MacCarthys of Insirahell near Crookstown, County Cork, and two sisters Julia and Grainé.

Religion 
Cormac MacDermot MacCarthy, conformed to the established religion by adhering to the Church of Ireland. His father had done the same. His son Charles studied at Oxford where Catholics were not accepted, but later became a Catholic.

Marriage and children 
Cormac MacDermot married Mary Butler, a daughter of Theobald Butler, 1st Baron Cahir. His wife's family, the Butler Dynasty, was Old English and descended from Theobald Walter, who had been appointed Chief Butler of Ireland by King Henry II in 1177.

 
Dermot and Mary had three sons:
Charles (died 1641), his successor
Teige, ancestor of the MacCarthys of Aglish
Donal (or Daniel) who built the castle of Carrignavar

—and one daughter:
Julia, married first David de Barry, 5th Viscount Buttevant as his second wife, and secondly Dermod O'Shaugnessy of Gort

16th Lord 
His father died in 1570 when Cormac MacDermot was about 18 years old. According to English Common Law he would have immediately succeeded as 14th Lord of Muskerry, but as a minor his estate would have been sequestered by the crown and he would have become a ward. However, Brehon law was applied and his uncle Sir Cormac MacTeige MacCarthy succeeded in his stead, according to tanistry. When this uncle died in 1583, another of his uncles, Callaghan, took his place as the 15th Lord, but resigned in 1584 when Cormac MacDermot eventually succeeded as 16th Lord of Muskerry.

House of Lords 
Being Lord of Muskerry did of course not include the right to sit in the House of Lords. It was therefore by a special favour that he sat in the House of Lords of the Parliament 1585–1586 as baron Blarney. The year is given as 1578 and is quite certainly wrong: no Irish parliament sat in 1578. Elizabeth's second Irish parliament sat 1569–1571 and her third 1585–1586.

Tyrone's Rebellion 

After the Spanish under Don Juan del Águila had landed at Kinsale on 2 October 1601, MacCarthy fought on the English side at the Siege of Kinsale during Tyrone's Rebellion. On 21 October 1601 he attacked the Spanish positions with his Irish forces fighting under George Carew, Lord President of Munster.

However, Carew suspected that MacCarthy was in contact with the enemy and about to surrender Blarney Castle to them. On 18 August 1602 he arrested MacCarthy and held him at Dublin Castle.

In 1614 Sir Lord Deputy Chichester granted him the Kilcrea Friary, which had been founded in 1645 by his ancestor Cormac Laidir MacCarthy, 9th Lord of Muskerry. Chichester specified that the friars should not be allowed to live in it and that the lands should only be let to Protestant tenants. MacCarthy was a Protestant at that time.

Death, succession, and timeline 
Muskerry died on 23 February 1616 at Blarney. He was buried in Kilcrea Friary,  which probably implied that he became a Catholic late in his life. He was succeeded by his eldest son Charles as the 17th Lord of Muskerry, who would become Baron Blarney and Viscount Muskerry in 1628.

Notes and references

Notes

Citations

Sources 

  – (for MacCarty)
  – (for Ormond)
  (for McCarty of Carrignavar)
 
 
 
  – L to M (for Muskerry)
  – S to T (for Strafford and Thomond)
  – Canonteign to Cutts (for Clancarty)
  – (Preview)
  – Scotland and Ireland
 
  – (for timeline)
  – to 1603
 
 
 
 
 
 
 
 
 
 
  – Irish stem
 
  – History
  – 1601 to 1602
 
 

1552 births
1616 deaths
MacCarthy dynasty